Avantika University is a private, cross-disciplinary university based in Ujjain, Madhya Pradesh, India. It has been described as India's first design-centered university. The university is supported by Maharashtra Institute of Technology's Institute of Design and will begin offering bachelor's and master's courses in design in 2017.

Programs

The university offers undergraduate, postgraduate, and executive programs in Industrial Design, Communication Design, User Experience along with Fashion Design, and Engineering.

Campus

The campus spreads over 1300,000 sq. ft, with academic, administrative, residential, sports and convention space. It also holds contemporary design studios, labs, and lecture theaters. High-speed digital connectivity, online libraries, interactive classrooms, and data centers are also available on campus.

References

External links

Universities in Madhya Pradesh
Educational institutions established in 2015
2015 establishments in Madhya Pradesh
Design schools in India
Buildings and structures in Ujjain
Education in Ujjain